The Real Ghostbusters is an animated television series.

The Real Ghostbusters may also refer to:
The Real Ghostbusters (comics), a comic series based on the television series
The Real Ghostbusters (1987 video game), an arcade game based on the television series
The Real Ghostbusters (1993 video game), a Game Boy video game based on the television series
"The Real Ghostbusters" (Supernatural), an episode of the television series Supernatural